
Gmina Kleszczewo is a rural gmina (administrative district) in Poznań County, Greater Poland Voivodeship, in west-central Poland.

Villages
Gmina Kleszczewo contains the villages and settlements of Bugaj, Bylin, Gowarzewo, Kleszczewo, Komorniki, Krerowo, Krzyżowniki, Lipowice, Markowice, Nagradowice, Poklatki, Śródka, Szewce, Tanibórz, Tulce and Zimin.

Neighbouring gminas
Gmina Kleszczewo is bordered by the city of Poznań and by the gminas of Kórnik, Kostrzyn, Środa Wielkopolska and Swarzędz.

References
Polish official population figures 2006

Kleszczewo
Poznań County